A Seabee is a member of the United States Navy construction battalions (CB).

Seabee, sea-bee or sea bee may also refer to:

 Seabee (barge), a barge loading system
 Sea Bee, a dissolved Hong Kong football team
 Republic RC-3 Seabee, an amphibious sports aircraft
 2C-B, a psychedelic phenethylamine in the 2C class of hallucinogenics

See also
 Seabee Heights
 Seabee Hook